Martti Lauronen (15 October 1913 – 4 June 1987) was a Finnish cross-country skier who competed in the 1930s. He won a gold medal in the 4 × 10 km relay at the 1938 FIS Nordic World Ski Championships. He finished fifth in the 18 km event in those same games.

Cross-country skiing results
All results are sourced from the International Ski Federation (FIS).

World Championships
 1 medal – (1 gold)

References

External links

Finnish male cross-country skiers
1913 births
1987 deaths
FIS Nordic World Ski Championships medalists in cross-country skiing
20th-century Finnish people